Dhamdhama Anchalik College is in Dhamdhama, Assam, India. It was founded in 1988. The college is affiliated to Gauhati University and recognized by University Grants Commission (UGC).

Since its inception, the institution imparts higher education to the economically backward people of this locality, especially those belonging to Scheduled Castes and Scheduled Tribes communities.

Location
The college is situated on the bank of rivulet Cheng, beside the weekly market of Dhamdhama. The rivulet, Cheng, a tributary of river Burhadia, has surrounded three quarters of the area of the college. The college is situated almost 13 km away from the district headquarters of Nalbari District, hardly 200 meters away from Dhamdhama Bus Stand and easily approachable from all sides.

General Rules of Admission And Eligibility
Generally, no admissions are allowed after the expiry of 30 days from
the opening of the college. Students are, therefore, required to be admitted
at the earliest after the declaration of their respective examination results.
The admission to the college course will be subject to the following:

1. Admissions must be taken in person, by presenting the prescribed
application form of the college duly filled in and on the payment of the
fees.
2. All admissions will be provisional and subject to confirmation by the
Principal and approval by the University.
3. At the time of admission, the following documents and certificates shall
have to be produced:
(a) Original statement of marks with the certified copy of H.S.L.C.
onwards.
(b) Passing certificate and its certified copy. Certificate indicating the
date of birth such as school leaving certificate or H.S.L.C. Certificate.
(c) In case of a student migrating from another University or Board, an
eligibility certificate from this University.

Courses of Study
Arts Faculty
Three years Degree Course :

Combination of subjects TDC Arts Stream

General Course:
i) Compulsory subject :
1. English 2. MIL (Assamese, Bodo, Hindi)
3. Environmental studies for TDC 3rd and 4th Semester

ii) Elective Subjects (Any two) :
1. Economics 2. Political Science
3. History 
4. Philosophy
5. Education 
6. Elective Languages : Assamese, Bodo
7. Computer Application

Major Subjects :

a) Assamese 
b) English 
c) Economics 
d) Political Science 
e) Philosophy
f) Education 
g) Bodo. 
Students offering Major in any of the above subjects will
have to tak 
1) English and 
2) MIL (Assamese, Boro, Hindi) as compulsory
subjects.

College Uniform

Dhamdhama Anchalik College has introduced its own dress code by way of the
college uniform, comprising the following :
Black Pant & Sky Blue Shirt for Boys
Black salwar/churidar, Sky Blue Kameez and Black Dupatta for Girls
Black Sweater/Cardigan during the winter season for Boys and Girls.

Wearing of the college uniform is compulsory and no other dress will be permitted. Students are directed to maintain decency in their attire, in keeping with the college tradition.

References

External links
 college website

Universities and colleges in Assam
1988 establishments in Assam
Gauhati University
Colleges affiliated to Gauhati University